Afropomus balanoidea is a species of freshwater snail, an aquatic gastropod mollusk in the family Ampullariidae, the apple snails and their allies.

Afropomus balanoidea is the only species in the genus Afropomus. Afropomus is the type genus of the subfamily Afropominae.

Based on the anatomy, mainly that of the reproductive system, Afropomus appears to be a primitive genus within the Ampullariidae. This basal position of Afropomus within Ampullariidae has also been confirmed by molecular phylogeny.

Subspecies 
Subspecies of Afropomus balanoidea include:
 Afropomus balanoidea balanoidea (Gould, 1850)
 Afropomus balanoidea nimbae Binder, 1963 This subspecies from the Ivory Coast has a higher spire.

Distribution 
The distribution of Afropomus balanoidea includes:
 Côte d'Ivoire
 Liberia
 Nigeria
 Sierra Leone

The type locality is Cape Mount in Liberia.

Its presence in Ghana is uncertain.

Description 
The shape of the shell is ovate.

The width of the shell is 20 mm. The height of the shell is 22–23 mm.

Ecology 
Afropomus balanoidea lives in clean water in ditches, creeks and small rivers. It requires a high concentration of oxygen.

References

External links 
 "Afropomus". The apple snail website.

Ampullariidae
Gastropods described in 1850